The Romanian Naval Forces is the principle naval branch of the Romanian Armed Forces and operates in the Black Sea and on the Danube. It traces its history back to 1860.

History

The Romanian Navy was founded in 1860 as a river flotilla on the Danube. After the unification of Wallachia and Moldavia, Alexandru Ioan Cuza, the ruling Domnitor of the Romanian Principalities, decided on 22 October 1860 by order no. 173 to unify the navies into a single flotilla. The navy was French-trained and organized. Officers were initially sent to Brest Naval Training Centre in France, as the Military School in Bucharest did not have a naval section. The first Commander-in-chief of the navy was Colonel Nicolae Steriade. The base was first established in 1861 at Izmail, but it was later relocated in 1864 to Brăila and in 1867 to Galați. The equipment was modest at best, with 3 ships from Wallachia and 3 from Moldavia, manned by 275 sailors. The main goal of the navy was to organize, train and expand this small force.

The first seamen's training school was established in 1872 at Galați for officers, petty officers and sailors. The first acquisition of the Romanian Navy was the steamboat "Prințul Nicolae Conache Vogoride". The ship was purchased in 1861 and was later transformed into a warship at Meyer naval shipyard in Linz, being christened "România" when it was launched at Galați harbor. In 1867, the royal yacht "Ștefan cel Mare" (Stephen the Great) entered service. In October 1873, the Fulgerul gunboat, ordered by the Romanian state as the first purpose-built warship in the history of the Romanian Navy, was finished at the Toulon shipyard in France. However, the ship was unarmed, so she would be allowed passage through the Turkish straits. After arriving in Romania in April 1874, she was fitted with a Krupp cannon in a mild steel turret at the Galați shipyard. The next ship to enter service with the Romanian Navy was the spar torpedo boat  in 1875. These ships represented the Romanian Flotilla during the War of Independence.

Romanian Navy during the War of Independence

During the War of Independence, the name used in Romanian historiography to refer to the 1877–1878 Russo-Turkish war, the Romanian Navy sailed under the Russian flag. The main task of the Romanian Flotilla Corps was to transport Russian troops, equipment and supplies across the Danube and to protect the bridges across the river by using mine barrages in key points. The main success of the war was the sinking of the Turkish river monitor "Seyfî" near Măcin by a group of spar torpedo boats including "Rândunica" and the Russian Carevitch and Ksenya crafts. Another notable success was the sinking of the Turkish river monitor "Podgoriçe" (Podgorica) by the Romanian coastal artillery on 7 November 1877.

After the war, the navy transported the Romanian troops back across the Danube. The small but successful navy had demonstrated the need for a strong Danube flotilla in order to secure the southern border of Romania. Three rearmament plans were implemented: during 1883–1885, 1886–1888 and 1906–1908. These plans mainly concentrated on the Danube flotilla. In 1898, the "Flotilla Corps", as it was known until then, was organized in two sections: the Danube fleet and the Black Sea fleet. The riverine base was at Galați, while the maritime base was at Constanța, which was by then part of Romania.

Creation of the Romanian Black Sea Fleet
The Romanian Black Sea Fleet was founded in the summer of 1890, 10 years after Romania acquired its first sea-going warship: the gunboat . The newly-created division consisted of the small protected cruiser , the training ship , the three Smeul-class torpedo boats, and the forementioned Grivița.

Involvement in the Potemkin mutiny

Elisabeta fired two warning shots, first a blank charge then an explosive charge, forcing the torpedo boat to retreat. Later that day, Potemkin and Ismail left Romanian waters. During the night of 7 July, however, Potemkin returned to the Romanian port, this time agreeing to surrender to the Romanian authorities in exchange for the latter giving asylum to the crew. On the noon of 8 July, Captain Negru, the commander of the port, came aboard the Potemkin and hoisted the Romanian flag before allowing the warship to enter the inner harbor. On 10 July, after negotiations with the Romanian Government, Potemkin was handed over to Imperial Russian authorities and taken to Sevastopol.

Romanian Navy during World War I

After the War of Independence, two naval rearmament programs were proposed for the Black Sea flotilla. The 1899 program called for six coastal battleships, four destroyers and twelve torpedo boats. None of these ships were ever built, while the battleship Potemkin was returned 1 day after being acquired. The 1912 naval program envisioned six 3,500-ton light cruisers, twelve 1,500-ton destroyers and a submarine. Four destroyers (and allegedly a submarine) were actually ordered from Italy but were not delivered, as the Italian Navy requisitioned them in 1914. Three 340-ton coastal submarines were ordered from France in early 1917, but these were also requisitioned at the end of the year and completed for the French Navy as the O'Byrne class. The largest Romanian Black Sea ship was the old cruiser , laid down in 1888. The protected cruiser had guarded the mouths of the river Danube during the Second Balkan War, but she was disarmed when World War I began. Her armament was emplaced on the bank of the Danube River to protect against possible attacks by Austro-Hungarian river monitors, and she remained in Sulina for the duration of the war. The Romanian Black Sea squadron also had four old gunboats from the 1880s, which were of limited value, and three old Năluca-class torpedo boats, built in France. The Romanian Navy had to rely on the armed merchant ships of the state merchant marine, known as SMR (Serviciul Maritim Român). The steam liners Regele Carol I, România, Împăratul Traian and Dacia were converted into auxiliary cruisers.

The Danube Flotilla was more modern, and consisted of four river monitors (Lascăr Catargiu, Ion C. Brătianu and Alexandru Lahovari) and eight British-built torpedo boats. The four river monitors were built in 1907 at Galați. They were armed with three 12-cm cannons each. In 1918, Mihail Kogălniceanu was converted to a sea-going monitor. The British torpedo boats of the Căpitan Nicolae Lascăr Bogdan class were built during 1906–1907 and weighed 50 tons each. There were also approximately six older gunboats used for border patrol and as minelayers, and other auxiliary ships used for transport or supply. The Romanian Navy had a secondary role during World War I and only had light losses. The river monitors participated in the defense of Turtucaia and later secured the flank of the Romanian and Russian defenders in Dobruja. The main success of the war was the mining of an Austro-Hungarian river monitor.

Romanian Navy during the interwar period

Following the end of World War I, the Kingdom of Romania took possession of three Austro-Hungarian river monitors (renamed after the newly incorporated territories of Ardeal, Basarabia and Bucovina), and in 1921 purchased four Italian patrol boats. These ships, together with the ones already in service, made Romania's Danube flotilla the most powerful riverine fleet in the world until World War II.

The main focus of the Romanian Navy during the interwar period was the Black Sea fleet. In 1920, two of the initial four Aquila-class scout cruisers (officially designated as destroyers) ordered from Italy were received. Another gunboat of the same class was bought for spares. Seven torpedo boats were received as war reparations from Austria-Hungary. The torpedo boat Fulgerul however was lost during the trip to Romania when she capsized and sank in the Bosphorus in 1922. In 1926, two additional destroyers were ordered from Italy: Regele Ferdinand and  Regina Maria of the Regele Ferdinand class destroyer, together with the Romanian Navy's first submarine, and the submarine tender . These ships were commissioned between 1930 and 1936.

The expansion of the Romanian Navy during the interwar period required more training facilities and ships. The first step towards this issue was taken in 1920, when a naval college was founded at Constanța. In 1938, the sail ship Mircea was built in Hamburg by the Blohm & Voss shipyard as a training vessel for the Romanian Navy. The SMR (Serviciul Maritim Român, the Romanian state merchant marine) was also endowed with a number of new ships: the steamer Oituz, the ex-German freighters Ardeal, Peleș, Alba Iulia and Suceava (all of them commissioned between 1932 and 1933), the passenger liners Basarabia and Transilvania (bought from Germany in 1938) and four new freighters from Italy just before the start of the Second World War: Balcic, Cavarna, Mangalia and Sulina. In 1940, the SMR had 17 merchant ships with a total of over 72,000 tons of shipping.

The 1937 naval program and subsequent developments
 

In 1937, a new rearmament program was proposed. The new plan envisioned a cruiser, four small destroyers, three submarines, two minelayers and ten motor torpedo boats. These warships were to be built locally at the Galați shipyard, where a new dry dock was developed.

The anti-aircraft escort minelayer  was laid down at the Galați shipyard in August 1938, launched in June 1939 and commissioned during the first half of 1941. She replaced the planned cruiser as the largest warship yielded by the 1937 program. She was employed in minelaying operations as well as convoy escort missions. Her sister ship, Cetatea Albă, was laid down in 1939, but abandoned at an early stage. Her construction was transferred to Germany and in 1940 she was completed by the Blohm & Voss shipyard in Hamburg. Cetatea Albă had the same standard displacement and top speed as her sister. It is not known, however, if her armament consisted of more than two 102 mm dual-purpose main guns, two 37 mm anti-aircraft guns and 135 mines. Cetatea Albă was likely never commissioned.

The four planned destroyers were replaced by four German M-class minesweepers. These were built locally from German materials in 1943. They were 500-ton vessels armed each with two 88 mm main guns, five anti-aircraft guns (two 37 mm and three 20 mm) and two depth-charge throwers.

Two of the three planned submarines were laid down at the Galați shipyard in 1938, launched in May 1941 and commissioned in May 1943. Her smaller sister ship, Rechinul, was a 585-ton minelaying submarine armed with one 20 mm anti-aircraft gun, four 533 mm torpedo tubes and 40 mines. The third planned submarine was replaced by five Italian CB midget submarines, commissioned in late 1943. The two minelayers were acquired in 1941.

Three of the ten planned motor torpedo boats were built by Vospers in the United Kingdom and acquired in 1940. They were named Viforul,  and Vijelia. Six more MTBs, of the Power type, were built locally as the  class. They were laid down in 1939 and commissioned in 1943. The planned number of MTBs was exceeded in August 1943, when seven Italian MAS were also commissioned. These were followed by four 65-ton German S-boats in August 1944, each armed with two 500 mm torpedo tubes.

World War II and postwar

In 1941, The Royal Romanian Navy had four destroyers (Mărășești, Mărăști, Regele Ferdinand and Regina Maria), one submarine (Delfinul), two minelayers (Amiral Murgescu and Cetatea Albă, also employed as a destroyer escorts), three auxiliary minelayers, three motor torpedo boats (Viforul, Vijelia, and ), three gunboats, fifteen small auxiliary vessels and twenty seaplanes.
Mărăști had a cracked shaft and could not exceed the speed of 24 knots. As a result, Mărăști never ventured far from the coast. Delfinul, the only Axis submarine present in the Black Sea in 1941, was obsolete and mechanically unreliable. By comparison, the Soviet Black Sea Fleet had a battleship, three medium cruisers, three light cruisers, three flotilla leaders, eight modern destroyers, five old destroyers, two large torpedo boats, 47 submarines and many other auxiliary and small vessels. The overwhelming superiority of the Soviet Navy forced the Royal Romanian Navy to conduct mainly defensive operations throughout the entire war and its warships rarely hazarded further east than Cape Sarych.

The two Regele Ferdinand-class destroyers were the most powerful surface units available to the Axis powers during the naval war in the Black Sea but were mostly used for convoy escort. The Romanian-built minelayer/destroyer escort Amiral Murgescu and the three auxiliary minelayers of the Romanian Navy played an important role in the defence of Constanța in 1941 and later in securing the merchant convoy routes to the Bosphorus and the supply routes to Odessa and Sevastopol. Mines were the main cause of Soviet submarine losses in the Black Sea naval war. Wartime additions to the fleet included 3 KFK naval trawlers and 3 landing craft of the MFP type.

The Royal Romanian Navy was involved in the evacuation of Axis forces from Crimea in 1944. The Romanian naval commander, Rear Admiral Horia Macellariu, was awarded the German Knight's Cross of the Iron Cross after Operation 60,000, the contingency plan for the evacuation of Crimea. Until King Michael's Coup, the Romanian Navy retreated behind the protection of the coastal mine barrages and anti-aircraft defences of Constanța as the Soviet Air Force began to launch heavy air attacks. On the capitulation of Romania in August 1944, the German warships were ordered to leave Romanian harbours. However, when the Soviet minesweeper T-410 Vzryv, accompanied by Amiral Murgescu, was sunk by a German submarine, the Soviet Navy accused the Royal Romanian Navy of betrayal and seized all vessels using this excuse on 5 September 1944. By this late stage of the war, only one destroyer (Regina Maria), one leader (Mărășești), two gunboats (Dumitrescu and Ghiculescu), one minelayer (Amiral Murgescu) and three motor torpedo boats were still operational. The rest of the warships were in repairs after the evacuation of Crimea and the Soviet air attacks of the preceding couple of months or had been relegated to training duties. The Soviet Navy moved all Romanian warships to Caucasian ports. They were not returned until after the war. The older vessels were received in September 1945, while the more modern ones (such as the Regele Ferdinand class) were kept by the Soviet Black Sea Fleet until the early 1950s. A number of warships were never returned.

The largest Romanian warship loss of the entire war was the accidental sinking of the gunboat Lepri. The gunboat ran into a Romanian mine laid by the minelayer Aurora near Sulina in January 1941, when hostilities between the Soviet Union and the Axis had not begun. While the Royal Romanian Navy had light losses throughout the war, the state merchant navy was practically non-existent by late 1944: every ship of the SMR was sunk or damaged by the Soviet Navy and Air Force because of the light Romanian and German forces in the Black Sea that were unable to provide adequate protection.

The following is a list of battles and operations of the World War II Black Sea Campaign involving the Romanian Navy:
 Raid on Constanța
 Operation München
 Action of 9 July 1941
 Siege of Odessa (1941)
 Crimean Campaign
 Operation Achse
 Crimean Offensive

The Romanian Naval Forces were reorganized during the Soviet occupation of Romania as the Romanian People's Navy. Under the Romanian People’s Navy, the "Nava Majestăţii Sale" (NMS) designation (or “His/Her Majesty's Ship”) that is given to each ship under Romanian Royal Navy was abolished.

World War II Romanian Black Sea Fleet warships
Romanian naval forces in the Black Sea consisted of four destroyers, four torpedo boats, eight submarines, three minelayers, one submarine tender, three gunboats and one training ship.

List of enemy warships sunk by the Romanian Navy during World War II

Command, control and organisation

The Romanian Navy is organized in one Frigate Flotilla and one Riverine Flotilla. Equipment includes two Type 22 frigates, one "Mărășești" class frigate, four corvettes (two Tetal-I and two Tetal-II), three Tarantul-I missile corvettes, three Osa class torpedo boats, one minelayer, four minesweepers, three "Mihail Kogălniceanu" class river patrol monitors, five Smârdan-class river monitors and other small craft and auxiliary ships.

As of 2022, ca. 6,800 men and women serve in the Romanian Navy. The main base of the Romanian Navy is located at Constanţa. The current chief of the Romanian Navy is Rear Admiral Mihai Panait, appointed on 15 August 2020. The Commander of the Romanian Fleet is Rear Admiral Ioan Condur, and the Commander of the River Flotilla is Rear Admiral Cornel Rogozan.

The Romanian Naval Forces ordered three IAR 330 Puma Naval helicopters, with the last one being commissioned in December 2008. The helicopters are of a similar configuration to those of the Romanian Air Force, including the SOCAT upgrade package; the Navy Pumas also have flotation gear fitted under the nose and main undercarriage fairings. They are currently operated from Navy frigates for search and rescue, medevac and maritime surveillance missions.

Structure of the Navy

 Fleet Command
 56 Frigate Flotilla (Mărășești, Regele Ferdinand and Regina Maria.)
 Naval Helicopter Group (IAR Puma Naval helicopters)
 150 Missile Fast Patrol Boat Squadron (Tarantul-I missile boats and 4K51 Rubezh anti-ship missile launching systems)
 50 Corvette Squadron 
Admiral Petre Bărbuneanu class corvettes 
Rear-Admiral Eustațiu Sebastian class corvettes
 146 MCM Squadron (Musca class minesweepers and the Cosar minelayer)
 River Flotilla
 67 Gunboat Squadron (Mihail Kogălniceanu-class and Smârdan-class)
 88 River Patrol Boat Squadron (VB 76 class)
 "Mircea cel Bătrân" Naval Academy
 "Vice Admiral Constantin Bălescu" Naval Training School
 "Admiral I. Murgescu" Navy Petty Officer School 
 Diving Center
 "CALLATIS" Radio-Electronics and Surveillance Center 
 IT Center
 Training, Simulation and Evaluation Center
 Maritime Hydrographic Directorate 
 Naval Medical Center
 Navy Museum
 Naval Logistics Base "Pontica"
 Special Destination Ship Squadron
 338 Naval Maintenance Center 
 335 Logistics Section, Mangalia
 329 Logistics Section, Brăila
 330 Logistics Section, Constanța
 325 Logistics Section, Tulcea 
 307 Marine Battalion
 110 Communications and IT Battalion 
 Naval Forces Support Battalion

Bases

As of 2011, the naval bases are in:

 Constanța – home of the frigate flotilla.
 Mangalia – home of the corvette squadron.
 Tulcea – home of the Smârdan (Brutar-II) class river patrol monitors.
 Brăila – home of the Mihail Kogălniceanu class river patrol monitors and the VB 141 class small river patrol monitors.

Naval infantry

The 307th Marine Battalion is the coastal defence unit of the Romanian Navy. The unit was formed in the mid 1970s for the defence of the Danube Delta and Romanian Black Sea shore. It was initially located at 2 Mai village near Mangalia, but since 1975 the Marine Battalion was moved to Babadag, Tulcea County. "The 307 Marine Battalion is destined to carry out military operations in an amphibious river and lagoon environment, the security of objectives in the coastal area, the Danube Delta and the support of local authorities in case of a civil emergency." Its base is near the largest military training range in Romania.

The battalion is organized into infantry, reconnaissance, sniper, mortars, anti-tank artillery, engineers, communications, logistic and naval support units. Standard equipment includes PA md. 86 assault rifles, PM md. 64 light machine guns, Md. 66 machine guns, 60/82/120 mm mortars, AG-7 and AG-9 launchers, 76 mm Md. 82 mountain howitzers, 11 ABC-79M and 3 TABC-79M armoured personnel carriers. The 307th Marine Battalion was involved in military exercises with similar troops from United States, the Netherlands, Spain, Portugal, Italy and Ukraine that were organized locally or abroad. Also, two companies from this unit have participated in the KFOR mission "Joint Enterprise" in 2008–09.

Since June 1, 2018, the 307th Marine Battalion has been redesignated as 307th Marine Regiment.

Equipment

Sea Fleet
For the river fleet and auxiliary vessels see List of active Romanian Navy ships .

Naval Aviation

Future equipment
The Romanian government plans to acquire new vessels to modernize the Romanian Naval Forces. This plan includes:
Buying 4 new ships for the navy. Previously these were to be based on the Sigma 10514 design of Damen Group. The frigates were to be built locally (Damen owns two major shipyards in Romania) and the total deal was estimated to be worth 1.6 billion euros (equivalent to U.S. $1.96 billion). However, the decision to go with Damen Group was repealed in 2017.
, acquiring 3 new submarines, which would also be built locally at a Romanian shipyard. In 2022, Romania signed a letter of intent with France to purchase s.
In July 2019, Naval Group won a €1.2 billion contract, which includes the construction of four new Gowind multi-mission corvettes for the Romanian Navy, as well as a new maintenance center and a training center. Naval Group was due to build the first corvette within three years, while the remaining three corvettes would have been constructed by Constanța Shipyard and delivered before 2026. However, this deal had not been concluded .

Ranks and insignia

References
Notes

References

External links

Official site of the Romanian Naval Forces (Romanian)

Military of Romania
 
1860 establishments in Romania